Sandro Resegotti (born 25 January 1966) is an Italian fencer. He competed in the team épée event at the 1992 Summer Olympics.

References

External links
 

1966 births
Living people
Italian male fencers
Olympic fencers of Italy
Fencers at the 1992 Summer Olympics